Australothis rubrescens, the Indian weed caterpillar, is a moth of the family Noctuidae. It is found all over Australia (including Tasmania) and in Papua New Guinea.

Larvae have been recorded on Sigesbeckia orientalis, Ixiolaena brevicompta, Podolepis longipedata, Hibisucs, Nicotiana tabacum, Solanum dioicum and Stylidium productum.

References

External links
 Australian Faunal Directory

Heliothinae
Moths described in 1858